Christopher Daniel Barnes (born November 7, 1972), also known professionally as C. D. Barnes, C. B. Barnes and Chris Barnes, is an American actor and writer. He is best known for his voice role as the title superhero of the 1990s animated series Spider-Man (1994–1998) and as Prince Eric in The Little Mermaid (1989), as well as his on-screen portrayal of Greg Brady in the films The Brady Bunch Movie (1995) and A Very Brady Sequel (1996).

He starred in 22 episodes of the science fiction series Starman (1986–1987) as the 14-year-old son of the title character played by Robert Hays. He played Leonard on Malcolm and Eddie (1998–2000).

Early life
Barnes was born on November 7, 1972 in Portland, Maine. He has a sister, Lisa, and a brother, Steve.

Career

Live-action roles

In the 1986–1987 series Starman, he played the teenage boy Scott, the son of the Starman. He starred in the NBC sitcom Day by Day for two seasons. In one episode's dream sequence which included many guest stars from The Brady Bunch, he played a fourth Brady son, "Chuck Brady". He later played Greg Brady in the Brady Bunch parody movies. He starred as Leonard Rickets in the sitcom Malcolm & Eddie.

He appeared in Beverly Hills, 90210, Clueless, Wings, Blossom, JAG, American Dreamer, The Golden Girls, Touched by an Angel, Herman's Head, Time Trax, 7th Heaven, Empty Nest, Girlfriends, CBS Schoolbreak Special and ABC Weekend Specials.

Disney work
At age 16 in 1989, Barnes voiced Prince Eric in The Little Mermaid and reprised the role in 2006 for Kingdom Hearts II. He was unable to return for the sequel The Little Mermaid II: Return to the Sea in 2000 and was replaced by Rob Paulsen. He voiced Prince Charming in the Cinderella sequels Cinderella II: Dreams Come True and Cinderella III: A Twist in Time.

As Spider-Man
Vocally, Barnes is best known for his main role in the 1994–1998 Spider-Man series. He later provided the voice of Spider-Man Noir in the 2010 video game Spider-Man: Shattered Dimensions, Spider-Man 2099 in the 2011 video game Spider-Man: Edge of Time, Electro, Spyder-Knight and Wolf Spider in the 2012 cartoon series Ultimate Spider-Man, and also voiced two special costumes, Symbiote Spider-Man and Superior Spider-Man 2.0, in the 2013 video game Marvel Heroes. He reprised his role of Electro and voiced Vulture in the Mobile game Spider-Man Unlimited.

Other work
He has done voices for other animated series including several characters in Captain Planet and the Planeteers, Tagert McStone in Jackie Chan Adventures, Stripes the Tiger in Sonic Underground, and also voiced adult Speckles from Speckles: The Tarbosaurus.

He has done voice acting in video games including Return to Krondor, as Scott Donovan in the Law & Order titles Law and Order: Dead on the Money and Law and Order: Double or Nothing.

Short stories
Barnes is a writer of short stories which he shares freely on his website at christopherdanielbarnes.com.

Personal life
Barnes earned his BA in 2004 and his MA in 2009 and enjoys reading, writing short stories, playing the guitar, and practicing yoga.

He was previously married to Dawn Nallick, but later divorced. In 2012, Barnes married his second wife Rebecca Guyadeen.

Filmography

Film

Television

Video games

References

External links
 
 
 
 
 

1972 births
Living people
American male film actors
American male television actors
American male voice actors
American male child actors
American male video game actors
Male actors from Portland, Maine
20th-century American male actors
21st-century American male actors